Jalra  may refer to:

Taal: a pair of clash cymbals from India
One of the trade names for Vildagliptin